The Heart of L.A. is the third compilation album edited by the French musician Frédéric Slama project AOR, released on 17 March 2017. Is a recording that where you can find 14 selected remastered tracks from the past plus 2 previously unreleased songs. It was produced, written and arranged by Slama and counting with many musicians as guest as is common in their previous efforts. It was released under Perris Records label, CDs were sold directly in Amazon, 
CD Baby Store and also counts with digital distribution.

At the moment of be released it was listed in the fourth position of the Top 5 Seller of the year 2017 in Perris Records website, and quickly received numerous reviews worldwide.

Guest singers per track
As AOR is a One Man Band, Frédéric Slama as always searched several international singers to record his compositions, in this record he counted with the French vocalists Sarah and Mélissa Fontaine from the band Chasing Violets whom shared duties in the tracks The Main Attraction, Don't Turn Back and When The Darkness Falls the last two under the nickname The FMS Project.

Track listing

Additional information
"Don't Turn Back" and "When The Darkness Falls", are unreleased tracks from The FMS Project.

Personnel
 Frédéric Slama – guitar & keyboards
 Tommy Denander – guitar, bass guitar  &  keyboards

Additional musicians
 Jesse Damon – lead vocals & Backing vocals
 Jeff Scott Soto – lead vocals & Backing vocals
 Bill Champlin – lead vocals & Backing vocals
 Fergie Frederiksen – lead vocals & Backing vocals
 Sarah Fontaine – lead vocals & Backing vocals
 Mélissa Fontaine – lead vocals & Backing vocals
 Steve Overland – lead vocals & Backing vocals
 Joe Pasquale – lead vocals & Backing vocals
 Paul Shortino – lead vocals & Backing vocals
 Rick Riso – lead vocals & Backing vocals
 Kevin Chalfant – lead vocals & Backing vocals
 David Forbes – lead vocals & Backing vocals
 Jim Jidhed – lead vocals & Backing vocals
 Philip Bardowell – lead vocals & Backing vocals
 Chris Ousey – lead vocals & Backing vocals
 Paul Sabu – lead vocals & Backing vocals

Production
 Producers – Frédéric Slama and Tommy Denander.

Press and media reviews
The band released a five-tracks video sampler in their YouTube Channel where fans and media could hear and get enough info about the recording.

Review made by Mark Rockpit from The Rockpit
Review made by Valeria Campagnale from My Global Mind
Review made by Steve Price from Rocktopia The Melodic Rock Website
Review available in Rock Report Website
Review available in Wescoast Website

References

External links
AOR Website
Discogs 
AllMusic
Heavy Harmonies

2017 compilation albums